William Addams Williams (10 August 1787 – 5 September 1861) was a Welsh lawyer, landowner and politician. He was a Member of Parliament for Monmouthshire from 1831–41.

Family

He was the eldest son of William Addams Williams of Llangibby Castle, and Caroline Marsh; she was the daughter of Samuel Marsh, who served as Member of Parliament for Chippenham.

Addams Williams married, through his connection and godfather Rev. George Avery Hatch, into a clerical family with a Welsh background at The Ham, Glamorgan. His wife, Anna Louisa Nicholl, was the daughter of Rev. Illtyd Nicholl, of Tredington parish in Worcestershire, and Anne Hatch (sister of George Avery); her brothers included Whitlock Nicholl the physician, and Illtyd Nicholl who inherited property near Usk.

With his wife Anna Louisa, Addams Williams had four children; one son, also named William Addams Williams, and three daughters.  William Evans, footballer and cleric, was a grandson.

Career
Addams Williams succeeded his father in 1823, at which point he may have given up his legal practice. He became closely involved in local politics, and in particular in the Monmouth Boroughs constituency. He became the High Sheriff of Monmouthshire in 1827. He was elected MP for the county constituency of Monmouthshire in 1831, as a Whig, at the time of the Great Reform Bill, after Sir Charles Morgan, 2nd Baronet as one of the sitting MPs had voted for a wrecking amendment. He was elected unopposed, a tribute to personal popularity rather than his reformist views, however. He was in fact one of the small group of reformist pushing ministers to go further than the Reform Act of 1832 that resulted. Sir Hopton Williams, Addams Williams' great-great-grandfather, was the last person from the family to hold the Monmouth seat, in 1708.

As MP, Addams Williams was involved in a Monmouth roads bill. He spoke against a private enclosure bill, for St Harmon, but it received a second reading. During his career Addams Williams ensured that both local and national newspapers were informed when they omitted or incorrectly inserted him in their published division lists. He resigned his seat in 1841, in bad health.

References

1787 births
1861 deaths
Welsh lawyers
19th-century Welsh lawyers
Whig (British political party) MPs for Welsh constituencies
UK MPs 1831–1832
UK MPs 1832–1835
UK MPs 1835–1837
UK MPs 1837–1841
High Sheriffs of Monmouthshire